Alea or ALEA may refer to:

Places
 Alea (Arcadia), a town of ancient Arcadia, Greece, located near the modern town in Argolis
 Alea (Thessaly), a town of ancient Thessaly, Greece
 Alea, Arcadia, a village in the municipal unit Tegea, Arcadia, Greece
 Alea, Argolis, a small town in Argolis, Greece

Organisations 
Alabama Law Enforcement Agency (ALEA)
 American Law and Economics Association (ALEA)

Other uses
 Alea (Greek soldier), origin of the word aleatoire (meaning "random")
 Alea (game), the earliest known tables game and possible ancestor of Backgammon
 Alea, originally a game-publishing subsidiary of Ravensburger, purchased by Heidelburger
ALEA Ensemble, an Austrian ensemble for contemporary music

See also
 Alea iacta est
 Alia (disambiguation)